Sokolovka is a rural locality (a selo) in Shirokologsky Selsoviet of Seryshevsky District, Amur Oblast, Russia. The population was 51 as of 2018. There are 2 streets.

Geography 
Sokolovka is located 82 km east of Seryshevo (the district's administrative centre) by road. Voskresenovka is the nearest rural locality.

References 

Rural localities in Seryshevsky District